Museo de Trajes Regionales is located in San Cristobal de las Casas, Chiapas, Mexico. The museum displays more than 100 costumes and dress from the indigenous populations of Chiapas.  This is unique because typically all clothing and personal possessions are buried with the dead.  Jewelry, musical instruments, costume accessories, religious objects, hats, masks, animal skins and statuettes are on display.  The tour is given by the museum collector and owner Sergio Castro Martinez, a knowledgeable local humanitarian.  He describes the locations, dress, ceremonies, ways and daily life of the indigenous.

References 

Yok Chij

Stichting Chiapas Indianen - Dutch foundation supporting the work of Sergio Castro

Trajes Regionales
Trajes Regionales
Trajes Regionales
San Cristóbal de las Casas